Aishath Nazima (born ) is a retired Maldivian athlete. She competed in Volleyball, Basketball, Netball, Athletics and Handball. She was selected as Asia's 11th player of the tournament. She won one silver medal and one bronze medal. She was part of the Maldives women's national Volleyball, Athletics, Netball, Basketball and Handball teams. She is the only woman to become the Vice president of Football Association of Maldives.

She participated at the Volleyball three-nation Cup (Colombo), Saff Games Volleyball  (1999 Nepal) Saff games Handball (Gohati India) Asian games Netball (Singapore) Asian Games Netball (Malaysia) Invitation tournament in Pakistan Handball. 1st Beach games Beach Volleyball (hampanthota Sri Lanka) at the 2010 Asian Games. On club level she played for the Maldives Police in 2010.

References

External links

1980 births
Living people
Maldivian women's volleyball players
Volleyball players at the 2010 Asian Games
Place of birth missing (living people)
Asian Games competitors for the Maldives